The list of ship decommissionings in 1983 includes a chronological list of all ships decommissioned in 1983.


See also

1983
 
Ship